Huairen East railway station is a railway station in Huairen, Shuozhou, Shanxi, China. It is an intermediate stop on the Hanjialing–Yuanping railway, on a section which is also used by the Datong–Xi'an high-speed railway. The station has two side platforms. On 1 May 2019, electric multiple unit services were introduced which cut the journey time to Taiyuan South railway station to under two hours.

See also
Huairen railway station

References 

Railway stations in Shanxi
Railway stations in China opened in 2014